Wharmby is a surname. Notable people with the surname include:

George Wharmby (1870–1951), English cricketer
Gordon Wharmby (1933–2002), British television actor

Fictional characters
John Wharmby, role in British soap opera Hollyoaks (see: List of Hollyoaks characters (2011))